The 2006–07 National Division Two was the seventh version (twentieth overall) of the third division of the English rugby union league system using the name National Division Two.  New teams to the division included Bradford & Bingley (champions) and Nuneaton (playoffs) who were promoted from the 2005–06 National Division Three North, Cambridge who came up from the 2005–06 National Division Three South and no new teams joined from the previous season's National Division One due to the RFU's decision to expand that league from 14 to 16 teams and ending relegation for that season alone.

At the end of the season Esher were the clear league winners, beating second place Launceston to the title by 9 points and defeating the Cornish side home and away, with both sides being promoted to the 2007–08 National Division One.  Relegated teams included Harrogate, Barking and newly promoted Bradford & Bingley.  All three sides finished well below 11th placed Halifax with Harrogate only winning one game all season.  Harrogate and Bradford & Bingley would drop to the 2007–08 National Division Three North while Barking would go down to the 2007–08 National Division Three South.

Participating teams and locations

Final league table

Results

Round 1

Round 2

Round 3

Round 4

Round 5

Round 6

Round 7

Round 8

Round 9

Round 10

Round 11

Round 12

Round 13

Round 14

Round 15

Round 16

Round 17 

Postponed.  Game rescheduled to 7 April 2007.

Round 18 

Postponed.  Game rescheduled to 24 March 2007.

Round 19

Round 20 

Postponed.  Game rescheduled to 24 March 2007.

Round 21

Round 22

Rounds 18 & 20 (rescheduled games) 

Game rescheduled from 27 January 2007.

Game rescheduled from 17 February 2007.

Round 23

Round 17 (rescheduled game) 

Game rescheduled from 13 January 2007.

Round 24

Round 25

Round 26

Total season attendances

Individual statistics 

 Note that points scorers includes tries as well as conversions, penalties and drop goals.

Top points scorers

Top try scorers

Season records

Team
Largest home win — 102 pts
107 - 5 Cambridge at home to Harrogate on 28 April 2007
Largest away win — 65 pts
70 - 15 Manchester away to Barking on 14 April 2007
Most points scored — 107 pts
107 - 5 Cambridge at home to Harrogate on 28 April 2007
Most tries in a match — 17
Cambridge at home to Harrogate on 28 April 2007
Most conversions in a match — 11
Cambridge at home to Harrogate on 28 April 2007
Most penalties in a match — 7
Esher away to Stourbridge on 3 February 2007
Most drop goals in a match — 2 (x2)
Henley Hawks away to Halifax on 31 March 2007
Henley Hawks away to Esher on 21 April 2007

Player
Most points in a match — 31 (x2)
 Alastair Bressington for Stourbridge away to Bradford & Bingley on 23 September 2006
 Neil Hallett for Esher away to Blackheath on 11 November 2006
Most tries in a match — 5
 Christoff Lombaard for Cambridge at home to Harrogate on 28 April 2007
Most conversions in a match — 11
 Dafydd Lewis for Cambridge at home to Harrogate on 28 April 2007
Most penalties in a match —  7
 Neil Hallett for Esher away to Stourbridge on 3 February 2007
Most drop goals in a match —  2 (x2)
 Mitch Burton for Henley Hawks away to Halifax on 31 March 2007
 Mitch Burton for Henley Hawks away to Esher on 21 April 2007

Attendances
Highest — 2,144 
Esher at home to Henley Hawks on 21 April 2007
Lowest — 115 
Barking at home to Henley Hawks on 21 October 2006
Highest Average Attendance — 847
Redruth
Lowest Average Attendance — 206		
Barking

See also
 English Rugby Union Leagues
 English rugby union system
 Rugby union in England

References

External links
 NCA Rugby

National
National League 1 seasons